The Turangalîla-Symphonie is the only symphony by Olivier Messiaen (1908–1992). It was written for an orchestra of large forces from 1946 to 1948 on a commission by Serge Koussevitzky in his wife's memory for the Boston Symphony Orchestra. Along with the Quatuor pour la fin du temps, the symphony is one of the composer's most notable works.

The premiere was in Boston on 2 December 1949, conducted by Leonard Bernstein. The commission did not specify the duration, orchestral requirements or style of the piece, leaving the decisions to the composer. Koussevitzky was billed to conduct the premiere, but fell ill, and the task fell to the young Bernstein. Bernstein has been described as "the ideal conductor for it, and it made Messiaen's name more widely known". Yvonne Loriod, who later became Messiaen's second wife, was the piano soloist, and Ginette Martenot played the ondes Martenot for the first and several subsequent performances.

From 1953, Yvonne's sister Jeanne Loriod was the ondes Martenot player in many performances and recordings.

Concept

While most of Messiaen's compositions are religious in inspiration, at the time of writing the symphony the composer was fascinated by the myth of Tristan and Isolde, and the Turangalîla Symphony forms the central work in his trilogy of compositions concerned with the themes of romantic love and death; the other pieces are Harawi for piano with soprano and Cinq rechants for unaccompanied trios of soprani, alti, tenors, and basses. It is considered one of the greatest musical compositions of the 20th century; being described by its commissioner as 'the most important piece of classical music ever written since Igor Stravinsky's The Rite of Spring'. A typical performance runs around 80 minutes in length. Messiaen famously summarised the entire symphony as being "a love song; a hymn to joy."

Although the concept of a rhythmic scale corresponding to the chromatic scale of pitches occurs in Messiaen's work as early as 1944, in the Vingt regards sur l'enfant-Jésus (a work Messiaen quotes in the fourth movement), the arrangement of such durations into a fixed series occurs for the first time in the opening episode of the movement "Turangalîla 2" in this work, and is an important historical step toward the concept of integral serialism.

The title of the work, and those of its movements, were a late addition to the project, chosen after Messiaen made a list of the work's movements. He described the name in his letters from 1947 to 1948.
"Lîla" literally means play – but play in the sense of the divine action upon the cosmos, the play of creation, destruction, reconstruction, the play of life and death. "Lila" is also love. "Turanga": this is the time that runs, like a galloping horse; this is time that flows, like sand in an hourglass. "Turanga" is movement and rhythm. "Turangalîla" therefore means all at once love song, hymn to joy, time, movement, rhythm, life and death.

Messiaen described the joy of Turangalîla as "superhuman, overflowing, blinding, unlimited". He revised the work in 1990.

Instrumentation

The piece is scored for a large orchestra with a particularly large percussion section:

Solo piano
Ondes Martenot
Woodwinds
 1 piccolo
 2 flutes
 2 oboes
 1 cor anglais
 2 clarinets
 1 bass clarinet
 3 bassoons
Brass
 4 horns
 3 trumpets
 1 trumpet in D
 1 cornet
 3 trombones
 1 tuba

Percussion (8 to 11 percussionists)

 Vibraphone
 Keyed or mallet glockenspiels
 Triangle
 Temple blocks
 Wood block
 Cymbals (crash and three types of suspended)
 Tam tam
 Tambourine
 Maracas
 Snare drum
 Provençal tabor
 Bass drum
 Tubular bells
 Celesta

Strings
 32 violins
 14 violas
 12 cellos
 10 double basses

The demanding piano part includes several solo cadenzas.

Cyclic themes

In writing about the work, Messiaen identified four cyclic themes that reappear throughout; there are other themes specific to each movement. In the score the themes are numbered, but in later writings he gave them names to make them easier to identify, without intending the names to have any other, literary meaning.

Structure
The work is in ten movements, linked by the common themes identified above, and other musical ideas:

The composer's initial plan was for a symphony in the conventional four movements, which eventually became numbers 1, 4, 6, and 10. Next, he added the three Turangalîla movements, which he originally called tâlas, a reference to the use of rhythm in Indian classical music. Finally, the 2nd, 5th, and 8th movements were inserted. Early on, Messiaen authorized separate performance of movements 3, 4, and 5, as Three tâlas (not to be confused with the original use of the term for the three Turangalîla movements), but later came to disapprove of the performance of extracts.

Recordings

See also
Classic 100 Music of France (ABC)
Leela (Futurama) (character named for the Turangalila-Symphonie)

Notes

References

External links
Turangalîla-Symphonie The Philharmonia Orchestra's Olivier Messiaen Website. Featuring films, photos, documents and much more. An interview with Esa-Pekka Salonen, a look at the percussion used and a visit to the site of the premiere in Boston.
Programme notes for the Turangalîla-Symphonie by Luke Berryman
About the ondes Martenot : facts, videos, pictures, recordings, players...
Audio excerpts from all 10 movements of the Symphonie

Compositions by Olivier Messiaen
Messiaen, Olivier Turangalia
1948 compositions
Concertante symphonies
Music commissioned by the Boston Symphony Orchestra
Music commissioned by Serge Koussevitzky or the Koussevitzky Music Foundation